Rida Wiam Wahab (born 14 February 2004) is a Lebanese footballer who plays as a defender for Lebanese club SAS.

International career 
Wahab captained the Lebanon national under-18 team at the 2019 WAFF U-18 Championship, helping her team win the tournament. She made her senior debut on 8 April 2021, coming on as a substitute in a friendly tournament against hosts Armenia.

Personal life 
Wahab's father, Wiam, is a Lebanese politician.

Honours 
SAS
 Lebanese Women's Football League: 2019–20
 WAFF Women's Clubs Championship runner-up: 2019

Lebanon U18
 WAFF U-18 Girls Championship: 2019

See also
 List of Lebanon women's international footballers

References

External links
 
 

2004 births
Living people
People from Aley District
Lebanese Druze
Druze sportspeople
Lebanese women's footballers
Women's association football defenders
Akhaa Ahli Aley FC (women) players
Stars Association for Sports players
Lebanese Women's Football League players
Lebanon women's youth international footballers
Lebanon women's international footballers